Grobschmidt is a surname. Notable people with the surname include:

John W. Grobschmidt (1896–1939), American businessman and politician
Richard Grobschmidt (1948–2016), American educator and politician

German-language surnames